COPP is a chemotherapy regimen for treatment of Hodgkin disease, consisting of concurrent treatment with (C)yclophosphamide, (O)ncovin, (P)rocarbazine and (P)rednisone.

It contains less procarbazine than MOPP (procarbazine is given only for 10 days in cycle instead of 14), and the very toxic mechlorethamine, which is prone to giving severe neutropenia and to severely heighten the risk of secondary malignancies, is changed to less toxic cyclophosphamide, which is more safe to the progenitor stem cells (thus, less neutropenia) and less prone to give late secondary malignancies.

Thus, the COPP regimen is considered safer and less toxic than MOPP. But it offsets with somewhat less efficacy, especially in advanced-stage Hodgkin disease.

Nevertheless, both the COPP and the MOPP are now supplanted by ABVD, which is less toxic and more effective than either COPP or MOPP.

Dosage

References

Chemotherapy regimens used in lymphoma